Lynn Nottage (born November 2, 1964) is an American playwright whose work often focuses on the experience of working-class people, particularly working-class people who are Black. She has received the Pulitzer Prize for Drama twice: in 2009 for her play Ruined, and in 2017 for her play Sweat. She was the first (and remains the only) woman to have won the Pulitzer Prize for Drama two times.

Nottage is the recipient of a MacArthur "Genius" Fellowship and was included in Time magazine's 2019 list of the 100 Most Influential People. She is currently an associate professor of playwriting at Columbia University and an artist-in-residence at the Park Avenue Armory.

Early and personal life
Lynn Nottage was born on November 2, 1964, in Brooklyn, New York. Her mother Ruby Nottage was a schoolteacher and principal; her father Wallace was a child psychologist. She went to Saint Ann's School for elementary school, and graduated from Fiorello H. LaGuardia High School. While in high school, she wrote her first full-length play, The Darker Side of Verona, about an African-American Shakespeare company traveling through the South.

She attended Brown University (AB 1986, DFA 2011) and the Yale School of Drama (MFA, 1989). After graduation, Nottage worked in Amnesty International's press office for four years. Most recently, Nottage received honorary degrees from Juilliard and Albright College.

Nottage is married to filmmaker Tony Gerber, with whom she has two children, Ruby Aiyo and Melkamu Gerber.

Career
Nottage's plays have been produced widely in the United States and throughout the world.

Plays

Intimate Apparel

One of her best-known plays is Intimate Apparel.

In 1905 New York, Esther, a Black seamstress, lives in a boarding house for women, and sews intimate apparel for clients who range from wealthy white patrons to prostitutes. One by one, the other denizens of the boarding house marry and move away, but Esther remains, lonely and longing for a husband and a future. Her plan is to find the right man and use the money she's saved to open a beauty parlor where Black women will be treated as royally as the white women she sews for.

Co-commissioned and produced at Baltimore's Center Stage, it premiered in February 2003 and South Coast Repertory. The Off-Broadway production at Roundabout Theatre Company opened in 2004, starring Viola Davis, and receiving critical acclaim. It received the 2004 AUDELCO Viv Award for Playwriting; AUDELCO (Audience Development Committee) recognizes and honors excellence in Black theatre. Intimate Apparel has since been commissioned by the MET / Lincoln Center to be adapted into an opera, and will be composed by Ricky Ian Gordon.

Since 2004, Intimate Apparel has become one of the most produced plays in America.

Ruined

Ruined dramatizes the plight of Congolese women surviving civil war. Set in a small mining town in Democratic Republic of Congo, Ruined follows Mama Nadi, a shrewd businesswoman protecting and profiting from the women she shelters.The play deals with the role of women in war and the societal stigma around Female Genital Mutilation (FGM).

It premiered in 2007 in the Goodman Theatre (Chicago) New Stages Series, and transferred to Off-Broadway at the Manhattan Theatre Club in February 2009. Ruined was awarded the 2009 Pulitzer Prize for Drama. Ruined also received the 2009 AUDELCO Viv Award for Dramatic Production of the Year.

On May 13, 2009, Nottage spoke at a public reception in Washington, D.C. following a United States Senate Foreign Relations joint subcommittee hearing entitled "Confronting Rape and Other Forms of Violence Against Women in Conflict Zones," with case studies on the Democratic Republic of Congo and Sudan.

On October 12, 2009, Nottage spoke at the United Nations as part of the Exhibit CONGO/WOMEN Portraits of War: The Democratic Republic of Congo.

By the Way, Meet Vera Stark

By the Way, Meet Vera Stark is a seventy-year journey through the life of Vera Stark, a headstrong African-American maid and budding actress, and her tangled relationship with her boss, a white Hollywood star desperately grasping to hold on to her career. When both women land roles in the same Southern epic, the story behind the camera leaves Vera with a surprising and controversial legacy.

It premiered Off-Broadway at Second Stage Theatre on May 9, 2011, with direction by Jo Bonney. The play is a "funny and irreverent look at racial stereotypes in Hollywood." The play was nominated for the 2012 Drama Desk Award, Outstanding Play. The play ran at the Geffen Playhouse in Los Angeles in September 2012, starring Sanaa Lathan, who played the role of the maid who becomes a stage star.

Sweat

Sweat tells the story of a group of friends who have spent their lives sharing drinks, secrets, and laughs while working together on the factory floor. But when layoffs and picket lines begin to chip away at their trust, the friends find themselves pitted against each other in a heart-wrenching fight to stay afloat.

Nottage received a commission from Oregon Shakespeare Festival and the Arena Stage. The play that she wrote as a result, Sweat, was presented at the festival in Ashland, Oregon from July 29, 2015, to October 31, 2015, directed by Kate Whoriskey. The play takes place in Reading, Pennsylvania, and involves steel workers who have been locked out of their factory workplace. The play was produced at the Arena Stage (Washington, D.C.) from January 15 to February 21, 2016, directed by Whoriskey. Nottage won the 2015–16 Susan Smith Blackburn Prize for this play. Sweat premiered Off-Broadway at the Public Theater on October 18, 2016 (previews), officially on November 3, again directed by Whoriskey. Here, the play was awarded the 2017 Obie Award for Playwriting. The play closed on December 18, 2016. Sweat opened on Broadway at Studio 54 on March 4, 2017, in previews, officially on March 26. This marks Nottage's Broadway debut.

Sweat was a finalist for the 2016 Edward M. Kennedy Prize for Drama. Sweat was again a finalist for the 2017 Edward M. Kennedy Prize for Drama Inspired by American History. The award is administered by Columbia University. The play won the 2017 Pulitzer Prize for Drama.

Other plays

Her short play Poof! (Heideman Award) was presented in 1993 at the Actors Theatre Of Louisville during the Humana Festival of New American Plays. It was then broadcast on PBS in 2002, with a cast that featured Rosie Perez and Viola Davis. Poof! was also recorded for podcast and public radio by Playing on Air, with a cast that featured Audra McDonald, Tonya Pinkins, and Keith Randolph Smith with direction by Seret Scott.

Her political satire Por'Knockers premiered in 1995 at the Vineyard Theatre, directed by Michael Rogers, featuring Sanaa Lathan.

The West Coast premiere of her Crumbs from the Table of Joy, at South Coast Repertory in September 1996, earned two NAACP Theatre Awards for performance.

Mud, River, Stone premiered in 1996 at The Acting Company directed by Seret Scott; it premiered in New York in 1997 at Playwrights Horizons, directed by Roger Rees. It was a finalist for the Susan Smith Blackburn Award, and won numerous regional theatre awards.

Las Meninas premiered in 2002 at San Jose Rep, directed by Michael Edwards. It was awarded a Rockefeller Grant, as well as the AT&T OnStage Award. It follows the true story of Queen Maria Theresa of Spain (wife of Louis XIV) and her affair with her African servant, Nabo, a dwarf from Dahomey.

Obie Award-winning Fabulation, or the Re-Education of Undine (her companion piece to Intimate Apparel, set one hundred years later), opened Off-Broadway at Playwrights Horizons in June 2004.

Her play Mlima's Tale premiered Off-Broadway at The Public Theater on March 27, 2018, in previews, officially on April 15 in a limited engagement to May 20. Direction is by Jo Bonney. The play concerns an elephant, Mlima, "trapped inside the clandestine international ivory market". Sahr Ngaujah plays Mlima. Mlima's Tale was nominated for the 2018 Outer Critics Circle Award for Outstanding New Off-Broadway Play, Outstanding Lighting Design (Play or Musical) (Lap Chi Chu) and Outstanding Sound Design (Play or Musical) (Darron L. West). The play was nominated for the 2019 Lucille Lortel Awards for Outstanding Play, Outstanding Director (Bonney), Outstanding Lead Actor in a Play (Sahr Ngaujah), Outstanding Costume Design (Jennifer Moeller) and Outstanding Lighting Design (Lap Chi Chu).

Nottage wrote the book for the world premiere musical adaptation of Sue Monk Kidd's novel The Secret Life of Bees, with music by Duncan Sheik and lyrics by Susan Birkenhead. It premieres at the Off-Broadway Atlantic Theater Company on May 12, 2019 in previews. The musical is directed by Sam Gold and features Saycon Sengbloh as Rosaleen, Elizabeth Teeter as Lily, LaChanze, Eisa Davis and Anastacia McCleskey. The musical had a workshop at the Vassar Powerhouse Theater, Martel Theatre in July 2017, directed by Sam Gold.

Other work

Nottage wrote a monologue, The Grey Rooster, following a former slave and his slaveholder's cockfighting rooster in post-Civil War Kentucky. It was performed as part of the National Civil War Project's production Our War, produced in 2014 at Arena Stage, directed by Anita Maynard-Losh.

Nottage contributed to the "dance-theatre musical" written Stephen Flaherty and Lynn Ahrens titled In Your Arms which premiered at the Old Globe Theatre, San Diego, in September 2015. The piece consists of ten vignettes and was directed and choreographed by Christopher Gattelli. Her vignette is titled A Wedding Dance and was performed by Marija Juliette Abney and Adesola Osakalumi with The .

Nottage wrote the book for a jukebox musical centered on Michael Jackson and titled MJ the Musical, originally aiming to premiere on Broadway in 2020; previews were delayed due to the COVID-19 pandemic, with the musical premiering in February 2022.

This is Reading

Nottage co-conceived This is Reading, an immersive transmedia project exploring the decline and rebirth of Reading, Pennsylvania: the setting of Nottage's play Sweat. This site-specific multimedia installation blended live performance and visual media, occupying the Franklin Street Railroad Station in Downtown Reading in May 2017, re-animating the long vacant building. Using as its foundation, the hardships, challenges, and triumphs of people living in and around Reading, This is Reading weaved individual stories into one cohesive tale of the city. It was produced in association with Market Road Films, the Labyrinth Theater Company and Project&.

This Is Reading was conceived by Nottage, and co-created by an award-winning team of artists, including filmmaker Tony Gerber, director Kate Whoriskey and Choreographer Rennie Harris. The creative team included composer Kashaka, projection designer Jeff Sugg, set designer Deb O, costume designer Jennifer Moeller, lighting designer Amith Chandrashaker, sound designer Nick Kourtides, muralist Katie Merz and producers Jane M. Saks, Blake Ashman-Kipervaser, Allison Bressi and Santo D. Marabella.

Market Road Films

She is the co-founder of a production company, Market Road Films, whose most recent projects include The Notorious Mr. Bout, directed by Tony Gerber and Maxim Pozdorovkin (Premiere/Sundance 2014); First to Fall, directed by Rachel Beth Anderson (Premiere/ IDFA, 2013); and Remote Control (Premiere/Busan 2013–New Currents Award).

Over the years, she has developed original projects for HBO, Sidney Kimmel Entertainment, Showtime, This is That, and Harpo Productions.

Film and television
Nottage was a producer and writer for the first season of She's Gotta Have It.

Themes
The Guardian noted:

Works

Full-length plays
Crumbs from the Table of Joy (1995)
Por'Knockers (1995)
Mud, River, Stone (1997)
Las Meninas (2002)
Intimate Apparel (2003)
Fabulation, or the Re-Education of Undine (2004)
Ruined (2008)
By the Way, Meet Vera Stark (2011)
Sweat (2015)
Mlima's Tale (2018)
Floyd's (2019)
Clyde's (2021)

Other works
Poof (1993) – short play
Our War (2014) – contributed material
In Your Arms (2015) – contributed material
 This Is Reading (2017) – co-conceived / multimedia installation
The Secret Life of Bees (2019) – wrote libretto
MJ the Musical (2021) – wrote libretto

Awards and nominations

Awards
 2022 Distinguished Achievement in the American Theatre Award 
 2019 Evening Standard Theatre Award for Best Play – Sweat
 2017 Pulitzer Prize for Drama – Sweat
 2017 Obie Award, Best New American Play – Sweat
 2016 Susan Smith Blackburn Prize – Sweat
 2009 Pulitzer Prize for Drama – Ruined
 2009 Lucille Lortel Award for Outstanding Play – Ruined
 2009 Drama Desk Award for Outstanding Play – Ruined
 2009 Obie Award for Best New American Play - Ruined
 2009 AUDELCO Viv Award for Dramatic Production of the Year – Ruined
 2009 Outer Critics Circle Award for Outstanding New Off-Broadway Play – Ruined
 2009 Drama Critics' Circle Award for Best Play – Ruined
 2005 Obie Award, Best New American Play - Fabulation
 2004 AUDELCO Viv Award for Playwriting – Intimate Apparel
 2004 Drama Critics' Circle Award for Best Play – Intimate Apparel
 2004 Outer Critics Circle Award, John Gassner Award – Intimate Apparel

Nominations
 2022 Tony Award for Best Book of a Musical – MJ
 2022 Tony Award for Best Play – Clyde's
 2022 Drama Desk Award for Outstanding Lyrics – Intimate Apparel
 2022 Drama Desk Award for Outstanding Book of a Musical – Intimate Apparel
 2019 Lucille Lortel Award for Outstanding New Play – Mlima's Tale
 2019 Lucille Lortel Award for Outstanding New Revival – Fabulation, or The Re-Education of Undine
 2019 Drama Desk Award for Outstanding Revival – Fabulation, or The Re-Education of Undine
 2019 Outer Critics Circle Award for Outstanding Revival – By the Way, Meet Vera Starke
 2019 Laurence Olivier Award for Best New Play – Sweat
 2019 South Bank Sky Arts Award for Theatre – Sweat
 2018 Outer Critics Circle Award for Outstanding New Off-Broadway Play – Mlima's Tale
 2017 Tony Award for Best Play – Sweat
 2017 Drama Critics' Circle Award for Best Play – Sweat
 2017 Drama Desk Award for Outstanding Play – Sweat
 2017 AUDELCO Viv Award for Dramatic Production of the Year – Sweat
 2017 AUDELCO Viv Award for Playwriting – Sweat
 2012 Drama Desk Award for Outstanding Play – By the Way, Meet Vera Stark
 2011 AUDELCO Viv Award for Playwriting – By the Way, Meet Vera Stark
 2009 Susan Smith Blackburn Prize – Ruined
 2005 Lucille Lortel Award for Outstanding Play – Intimate Apparel
 2001 Susan Smith Blackburn Prize – Mud, River, Stone

Other awards
 2019 Golden Plate Award of the American Academy of Achievement presented by Awards Council member Bartlett Sher
 2018 Induction into the American Academy of Arts and Letters
 2017 Induction into The American Academy of Arts and Science
 2017 Award of Merit, American Academy of Arts and Letters to "an outstanding playwright for her body of work"
 2017 AUDELCO Award for Outstanding Achievement
 2017 Lucille Lortel Sidewalk Star
 2016 PEN/Laura Pels "Master American Dramatist" Award
 2016 Literature Award from The Academy of Arts and Letters
 2016 Columbia University Provost Grant
 2016 Doris Duke Artist Award, 2016
 2013 Madge Evans-Sidney Kingsley Award
 2012 Nelson A. Rockefeller Award For Creativity
 2010 Steinberg "Distinguished Playwright" Award
 2010 Horton Foote Award
 2007 MacArthur "Genius Grant" Fellowship
 2005 Guggenheim Foundation Fellowship for Drama and Performance Art
 2004 PEN/Laura Pels "Mid-Career Playwright" Award
 2000 & 1994 New York Foundation for the Arts Fellowship
 1994 Van Lier Playwright Fellowship
 National Black Theatre Festival August Wilson Playwriting Award

Fellowships, commissions, and residencies
 Signature Theatre Company, 2018–2019 Residency One
 Park Avenue Armory (2017–2018)
 Arena Stage
 New Freedom Theatre
 New Dramatists (1999–2006)

References

External links

Official site
Nosheen Iqbal, "Interview: Lynn Nottage: a bar, a brothel and Brecht", The Guardian, April 20, 2010. Accessed April 20, 2010

Biography at New Dramatists
"The Playwrights Database, Lynn Nottage" doollee.com 

1964 births
Living people
20th-century American dramatists and playwrights
African-American dramatists and playwrights
MacArthur Fellows
Pulitzer Prize for Drama winners
Yale School of Drama alumni
Brown University alumni
Columbia University faculty
American women dramatists and playwrights
20th-century American women writers
Saint Ann's School (Brooklyn) alumni
Fiorello H. LaGuardia High School alumni
American women academics
20th-century African-American women writers
20th-century African-American writers
21st-century African-American people
21st-century African-American women
Members of the American Academy of Arts and Letters